Jon Myong-hwa (born 9 August 1993) was a female North Korean football midfielder.

She was part of the North Korea women's national football team at the 2012 Summer Olympics.
On club level she played for April 25.

International goals

Under-19

National team

See also
 North Korea at the 2012 Summer Olympics

References

External links
 
 
soccerobserver
zimbio
Getty Images
usatoday

1993 births
Living people
North Korean women's footballers
Place of birth missing (living people)
Footballers at the 2012 Summer Olympics
Olympic footballers of North Korea
Women's association football midfielders
Asian Games medalists in football
Footballers at the 2010 Asian Games
Footballers at the 2014 Asian Games
2011 FIFA Women's World Cup players
North Korea women's international footballers
Asian Games gold medalists for North Korea
Asian Games silver medalists for North Korea
Medalists at the 2010 Asian Games
Medalists at the 2014 Asian Games
21st-century North Korean women